Samuel "Samu" Sánchez González (born 5 February 1978) is a Spanish former professional road bicycle racer, who rode professionally in the sport between 2000 and 2017 for the  and  squads. He was the gold medal winner in the road race at the 2008 Beijing Olympics. In the following years Sánchez proved himself in hilly classics and stage races as one of the most important riders in the peloton. He was also known as one of the best descenders in the peloton. He finished in the top 6 of the Tour de France three times and in the top 10 of the Vuelta a España 6 times. Other notable achievements include winning the Vuelta a Burgos in 2010, the 2012 Tour of the Basque Country and five stages of the Vuelta a España.

Career

Euskaltel–Euskadi (2000–13)
He started his professional career in 2000 at the Spanish team  and remained there until the team's disbanding in 2013.

Early years
In 2003, Sánchez finished 6th in Liège–Bastogne–Liège and third overall in the Tour of the Basque Country. The following year, he came 4th in Liège–Bastogne–Liège, and came 15th overall in his first Vuelta a España. He recorded his first major victory in 2005 when he won the 13th stage in the Vuelta a España, finishing 11th in the general classification. After winner Roberto Heras was erased from the results for doping use, Sánchez shifted up to the 10th place.

2006
In 2006, Sánchez added two stage wins in the Tour of the Basque Country and a second place on the steep finishing climb of the Belgian spring classic La Flèche Wallonne. He finished 4th overall in Paris–Nice, winning the points jersey in the process. In the Vuelta a España he won the 13th stage with a daring attack in a downhill section and finished 7th in the general classification. At the UCI Road World Championships in the Austrian city of Salzburg Sánchez played a major part by creating the decisive break in the final kilometre for his leader Alejandro Valverde. Sánchez himself finished 4th behind Paolo Bettini, Erik Zabel and Valverde. One week later he won Züri-Metzgete, his first classic. With  to go he attacked to solo into Zürich with half a minute to spare over Stuart O'Grady and Davide Rebellin. Two weeks later he finished second in the Giro di Lombardia, and secured his second place in the final UCI ProTour classification.

2007

In 2007, Sánchez started with a ninth place in Paris–Nice and he won the final time trial in the Tour of the Basque Country, finishing third in the final classification. After a winless classics season Sánchez won the final stage in the Volta a Catalunya. In the Vuelta a España he won the 15th stage ahead of Manuel Beltrán, after attacking in Alto de Monachil, showing his fast descending skills to catch Beltrán in the descent to Granada. Beltrán asked Sánchez to let him win, but Sánchez wanted to dedicate this win to his future son, expected to be born in March 2008. Sánchez won by some metres and reached the finish line as if holding a baby in his arms. He also won the last mountain stage up to Alto de Abantos and the last time trial, allowing him to move into 3rd overall.

2008
In 2008, Sánchez rode his first complete Tour de France, and finished 6th overall. In August Sánchez won the Olympic road race in 90% humidity and smog, a race that ran twice each lap through stone gates in the Great Wall of China. About a quarter of the way through the race, a breakaway group of 26 riders ahead of the peloton were the first viable group to have a chance of winning the race, but Sánchez was not among them. At the sprint finish of six men, after an uphill section that ran through a gate in The Great Wall one last time, Sánchez finished a wheel ahead of Italy's Davide Rebellin to take gold, with Cancellara taking the bronze.

2009–2010
In 2009, Sánchez won the Gran Premio de Llodio, and he came third overall in the Tour of the Basque Country, winning the points classification. He finished second to Alejandro Valverde in the Vuelta a España, his second podium finish in the event. Sánchez also came second in the Giro di Lombardia, after getting back to Philippe Gilbert who attacked in the last climb. The pair collaborated well together during the last kilometres to keep the chasers at bay during the descent and Sánchez lost the sprint by half a bike length.

In 2010, Sánchez came first overall in the Vuelta a Burgos, as well as winning two stages and the points classification in the event. He also won a stage in the Tour of the Basque Country, winning the points classification in the race as well. Sánchez carried his good form into the Tour de France where he finished 4th overall, after losing out on a podium place to Denis Menchov in the final time trial. He was later moved up to 3rd overall after the disqualification of Alberto Contador and then Sánchez moved up to 2nd overall after the disqualification of Menchov, too.

2011
Sánchez was among the favourites heading into the Tour de France, but a series of crashes in the first week saw him well down the classification as the race entered the Pyrenees. On Stage 12, the first summit finish of the Tour, Sánchez attacked the overall contenders on the final climb, to win the stage and gain back some time. The revised scoring system for the King of the Mountains competition also meant that Sánchez took the polka dot jersey. However, Jérémy Roy took the jersey the next day. On Stage 14, the next summit finish, Sánchez again attacked the overall contenders, and finished second on the stage to move up to sixth overall. He moved up to fifth on Stage 16, as he, Cadel Evans and Alberto Contador took time out of the other favorites on the descent into Gap. However, on Stage 18, Sánchez lost time on the Col du Galibier and dropped to 8th overall. On the following stage though, he and Contador attacked on Alpe d'Huez, with Sánchez finishing second to Pierre Rolland. This result moved him up to 7th overall, and meant he had effectively King of the Mountains competition as there were no climbs remaining in the Tour. Sánchez moved ahead of Damiano Cunego in the final Time Trial to finish the Tour 6th overall and 5th after Contador's suspension, and winner of the mountains classification.

2012
In 2012, Sánchez's main focus was the Tour de France and the Olympic Games. He started the season in good form when he won the Tour of the Basque Country. He won stage 3, which was deemed as the queen stage of the race, shaking off Joaquim Rodríguez and Chris Horner on the last climb of the day, the steep Alto de Ustartza. He then prevailed in the sixth and final stage, an individual time trial held in Oñati. He took the leader's jersey from Rodríguez winning the general classification by 12 seconds. In July, bad luck struck on the eighth stage of the Tour de France where he crashed heavily on a narrow road after  of racing. Sanchez was forced to withdraw due to numerous injuries, namely a broken finger bone and a badly bruised upper back and shoulderblade.

2013

In 2013, Sánchez aimed for the Giro d'Italia. However, he only was able to finish 12th overall, despite still recovering from his injury he suffered during the previous year's Tour de France. After the Giro, Sánchez won stage 6 in the Criterium du Dauphiné after out sprinting Jakob Fuglsang. The latter was his only victory of the year.

BMC Racing Team (2014–17)
After the demise of the  team, Sánchez and many former riders of the team faced difficulties securing new contracts for the 2014 season. The Ardennes classics along with Grand Tours were stated as his main objectives. In addition he finished fifth in the Giro di Lombardia. However he was not selected by the national coach Javier Mínguez for the UCI Road World Championships in Ponferrada and was upset about it.

In January 2015,  announced that they had re-signed Sánchez for the 2015 season. The team's sporting manager Allan Peiper stated that Sánchez's role in the team would be similar to that in 2014, but with a greater focus on supporting and developing the team's younger riders.

Sanchez rode the Vuelta a España, but crashed out in the last time trial.

In the 2017 Tour of the Basque Country, Sánchez was close to a stage victory, but crashed and was injured; this injury plagued him for the first half of the year. When asked if he was considering retirement, Sánchez responded that he did not know what he wanted yet, and that he would wait until after the Vuelta a España. However, a few days before the Vuelta started, an out-of-competition doping test from Sánchez came back positive for the growth hormone releasing peptide GHRP-2, and he was therefore provisionally suspended, and not allowed to start the race.

Suspension
On 13 May 2019, the UCI, the sport's governing body, suspended Sánchez for two years, effective from his initial provisional suspension on 17 August 2017. The UCI accepted that the positive test came from a contaminated supplement, yet chose to suspend him nevertheless. While Sánchez could return to competition in August 2019, Cyclingnews.com considered this unlikely given his age of 41.

Major results

1999
 3rd Road race, National Under-23 Road Championships
2000
 2nd Tro-Bro Léon
2002
 4th Overall Volta ao Algarve
 10th Overall Tour of the Basque Country
2003
 2nd Tour du Haut Var
 2nd Klasika Primavera
 3rd Overall Tour of the Basque Country
 5th Subida al Naranco
 6th Liège–Bastogne–Liège
 7th Overall Vuelta a Asturias
 9th Overall Paris–Nice
2004
 1st  Overall Escalada a Montjuïc
1st Stages 1a & 1b (ITT)
 3rd Overall Vuelta a Andalucía
 3rd Overall Euskal Bizikleta
 4th Liège–Bastogne–Liège
 4th Subida al Naranco
 8th Overall Tour of the Basque Country
 10th Overall Vuelta a Asturias
 10th Gran Premio de Llodio
2005
 1st  Overall Escalada a Montjuïc
1st Stage 1b (ITT)
 2nd Overall Vuelta a Asturias
 5th Züri-Metzgete
 9th Clásica de San Sebastián
 10th Overall Vuelta a España
1st Stage 13
2006
 1st Züri-Metzgete
 1st Stage 3 Vuelta a Asturias
 2nd Giro di Lombardia
 2nd La Flèche Wallonne
 4th Road race, UCI Road World Championships
 4th Overall Paris–Nice
1st  Points classification
 6th Overall Tour of the Basque Country
1st Stages 2 & 3
 7th Overall Vuelta a España
1st Stage 13
2007
 1st Stage 7 Volta a Catalunya
 2nd Overall Escalada a Montjuïc
 3rd Overall Vuelta a España
1st Stages 15, 19 & 20 (ITT)
 3rd Overall Tour of the Basque Country
1st Stage 6 (ITT)
 3rd Giro di Lombardia
 7th Road race, UCI Road World Championships
 7th Overall Euskal Bizikleta
 9th Overall Paris–Nice
2008
 Olympic Games
1st  Road race
6th Time trial
 1st Stage 2b (ITT) Vuelta a Asturias
 6th Overall Tour de France
 7th Clásica de San Sebastián
2009
 1st Gran Premio de Llodio
 2nd Overall Vuelta a España
 2nd Giro di Lombardia
 3rd UCI World Ranking
 3rd Overall Tour of the Basque Country
1st  Points classification
 4th Road race, UCI Road World Championships
 4th La Flèche Wallonne
 4th Subida al Naranco
 9th Overall Volta a Catalunya
 10th Overall Vuelta a Asturias
 10th Liège–Bastogne–Liège
2010
 1st  Overall Vuelta a Burgos
1st  Points classification
1st Stages 2 & 5
 1st Klasika Primavera
 2nd Overall Tour de France
 4th Overall Paris–Nice
 4th Overall Critérium International
 5th Overall Volta ao Algarve
 6th Grand Prix Cycliste de Montréal
 6th Giro di Lombardia
 7th Overall Tour of the Basque Country
1st  Points classification
1st Stage 4
 8th UCI World Ranking
 9th Clásica de San Sebastián
2011
 1st GP Miguel Induráin
 3rd La Flèche Wallonne
 4th Overall Vuelta a Burgos
1st Stage 1
 5th Overall Tour de France
1st  Mountains classification
1st Stage 12
 5th Overall Paris–Nice
 6th UCI World Tour
 6th Overall Tour of the Basque Country
1st Stage 4
 7th Clásica de San Sebastián
 9th Overall Vuelta a Andalucía
 10th Liège–Bastogne–Liège
2012
 1st  Overall Tour of the Basque Country
1st  Points classification
1st Stages 3 & 6 (ITT)
 2nd Overall Volta a Catalunya
1st Stage 6
 2nd Giro di Lombardia
 6th Overall Vuelta a Murcia
 7th Amstel Gold Race
 7th Liège–Bastogne–Liège
 9th UCI World Tour
2013
 8th Overall Vuelta a Burgos
 8th Overall Vuelta a España
 9th Overall Critérium du Dauphiné
1st Stage 7
2014
 5th Giro di Lombardia
 6th Overall Vuelta a España
2015
 1st Stage 9 (TTT) Tour de France
 1st Stage 3 (TTT) Critérium du Dauphiné
 1st Stage 1 (TTT) Vuelta a España
 2nd Overall Tour de Yorkshire
2016
 4th Liège–Bastogne–Liège
 6th Overall Tour of the Basque Country
1st Stage 4
 6th Overall Tour of California
 6th La Flèche Wallonne
2017
 1st Stage 2 (TTT) Volta a Catalunya

General classification results timeline

Monuments results timeline

References

External links

 
 
 
 
 
 
 
 
 

1978 births
Living people
Cyclists from Asturias
Spanish male cyclists
Olympic gold medalists for Spain
Cyclists at the 2008 Summer Olympics
Olympic cyclists of Spain
Spanish Vuelta a España stage winners
Spanish Tour de France stage winners
Sportspeople from Oviedo
Olympic medalists in cycling
Medalists at the 2008 Summer Olympics
2011 Tour de France stage winners
Doping cases in cycling
Spanish sportspeople in doping cases